Muckamore railway station served the village of Muckamore near Antrim in County Antrim, Northern Ireland.

History

The station was opened by the Belfast and Ballymena Railway on 1 July 1905. It closed to passengers on 9 September 1961.

References 

Disused railway stations in County Antrim
Railway stations opened in 1848
Railway stations closed in 1954
Railway stations in Northern Ireland opened in 1848